|}

The Punchestown Champion Hurdle is a Grade 1 National Hunt hurdle race in Ireland which is open to horses aged four years or older. It is run at Punchestown over a distance of about 2 miles (3,219 metres), and during its running there are nine hurdles to be jumped. The race is scheduled to take place each year during the Punchestown Festival in late April or early May.

The present version of the race was introduced in 1999, and it was initially sponsored by Shell. Several different sponsors have followed, including Emo Oil, ACCBank, Rabobank,  Racing Post and Betdaq. Its current sponsor, Paddy Power, began supporting the race in 2021.

The field usually includes horses which ran previously in the Champion Hurdle at Cheltenham, and the last to win both events in the same year was Honeysuckle in 2022. For a period the race was restricted to horses aged five or older, but the minimum age was lowered to four in 2009.

Records
Most successful horse since 1999 (4 wins):
 Hurricane Fly - 2010, 2011, 2012, 2013

Leading jockey since 1999 (6 wins):

 Ruby Walsh - Davenport Milenium (2002), Hurricane Fly (2011, 2012, 2013), Faugheen (2015), Vroum Vroum Mag (2016)

Leading trainer since 1999 (8 wins):
 Willie Mullins – Davenport  (2002), Hurricane Fly (2010, 2011, 2012, 2013), Faugheen (2015), Vroum Vroum Mag (2016), Wicklow Brave (2017)

Winners since 1999

See also
 Horse racing in Ireland
 List of Irish National Hunt races

References
 Racing Post:
 , 

 pedigreequery.com – ACCBank Champion Hurdle – Punchestown.
 racenewsonline.co.uk – Racenews Archive (April 25, 2003).

National Hunt races in Ireland
National Hunt hurdle races
Punchestown Racecourse
Recurring sporting events established in 1999
1999 establishments in Ireland